"Ha" or "Ha": Killing Joke Live is the first commercially distributed live recording by English post-punk band Killing Joke. It was recorded at Larry's Hideaway in Toronto, Ontario, Canada on 9 and 10 August 1982 by producer Conny Plank, and released on 4 November by E.G. Records. Rob O'Connor did the artwork for the album.

Release 

Ha was originally released on 4 November 1982, in 10-inch and cassette EP formats, by E.G. Records. It reached number 66 in the UK Albums Chart.

It was re-released on CD in 2005 by Virgin Records, with three bonus tracks taken from Killing Joke's 1982 single, Birds of a Feather.

Track listing

Personnel 
Killing Joke
 Jaz Coleman – vocals, synthesizer
 Kevin "Geordie" Walker – guitar
 Paul Raven – bass guitar
 Paul Ferguson – drums, vocals

Charts

References 

Albums produced by Conny Plank
Killing Joke live albums
1983 live albums